Igor Yakovlevich Rabiner (born 13 February 1973 in Moscow) is a Russian football journalist and writer known for his work with Sport-Express and his books, most notably his controversial bestseller How Spartak Was Being Killed, where he describes the crisis FC Spartak Moscow faced in the early 2000s, at the end of Oleg Romantsev's reign and immediately after it. Later, that book was followed by its sequel, How Spartak Was Being Killed 2 about the later events, and Lokomotiv We Have Lost («Локомотив», который мы потеряли) that exploits similar themes regarding another popular Russian football team, Lokomotiv Moscow. In 2012, after being sacked by Sport-Express he moved to the Championat.com sports portal.

In April 2022 Rabiner was named one of the 50 most important people in the history of Spartak Moscow, of which he is a fan.

Bibliography 
 Football. Farewell to the Century (Футбол. Прощание с веком), 2001, Terra-Sport, 
 How Spartak Was Being Killed (Как убивали «Спартак»), 2006, Trade Secret, 
 How Spartak Was Being Killed 2 (Как убивали «Спартак» 2), 2007, OLMA Media Group, 
 Lokomotiv We Have Lost («Локомотив», который мы потеряли), 2008, OLMA Media Group. 
 Our Football Russia (Наша футбольная Russia). — 2008, OLMA Media Group. 
 Mysteries of Olympic Gold. Isinbaeva, Dementieva and others (Тайны олимпийского золота. Исинбаева, Дементьева и другие). — 2008, OLMA Media Group. 
 EURO 2008. The Bronze Dream of Russia (Euro-2008. Бронзовая сказка России). — 2008, OLMA Media Group. 
 The Truth About Zenit (Правда о «Зените»). — 2009, OLMA Media Group. 
 Hockey Madness: From Nagano To Vancouver (Хоккейное безумие: от Нагано до Ванкувера). — 2009, OLMA Media Group. 
 The Scandal Echo of Maribor (Скандальное эхо Марибора). – 2010, OLМA Media Group. 
 Life Of Remarkable Coaches (Жизнь замечательных тренеров). – 2010, OLMA Media Group. 
 Spartak Confessions (Спартаковские исповеди). – 2011, OLMA Media Group. 
 How Did Russia Get 2018 World Cup, Sports & Political Investigation (Как Россия получила чемпионат мира по футболу – 2018. Спортивно-политическое расследование). – 2012, Astrel. 
 Dick Advokaat & Guus Hiddink: Unbelievable Adventures of the Dutchmen in Russia (Дик Адвокат и Гус Хиддинк: невероятные приключения голландцев в России). – 2012, Astrel.

References 

Russian journalists
Russian sports journalists
Russian Jews
Writers from Moscow
1973 births
Living people